Linda C. Babcock is an American academic. She is the James M. Walton Professor of Economics and former dean at Carnegie Mellon University's Heinz College, and is the former head of the Social and Decision Sciences department. She is also the founder and faculty director of the Program for Research and Outreach on Gender Equity in Society (PROGRESS).

Background
Dr. Babcock earned her Bachelor of Arts degree in Economics from the University of California at Irvine and her Master of Arts and Doctor of Philosophy degrees in Economics from the University of Wisconsin at Madison. A visiting professor at the Graduate School of Business at the University of Chicago, the Harvard Business School, and the California Institute of Technology, she is also a member of the Behavioral Economics Roundtable coordinated by the Russell Sage Foundation. In addition, she has served on the economics review panel for the National Science Foundation.

Babcock's research concerns the wage gap and the perception that women are more reluctant than men to ask for salary increases.

Works

References

Living people
University of California, Irvine alumni
University of Wisconsin–Madison College of Letters and Science alumni
Carnegie Mellon University faculty
American women academics
1961 births